NGSmethDB is a database of methylation data derived from next-generation sequencing data.

See also
 DNA methylation
 MethBase
 MethDB

References

External links
 http://bioinfo2.ugr.es/NGSmethDB/gbrowse/

Genetics databases
Epigenetics
DNA
DNA sequencing